The Outsider is the third studio album by American hip hop producer DJ Shadow, released by Universal Motown Records on September 19, 2006. It peaked at number 77 on the Billboard 200 chart.

Critical reception

At Metacritic, which assigns a weighted average score out of 100 to reviews from mainstream critics, the album received an average score of 62, based on 31 reviews, indicating "generally favorable reviews".

Dave Kerr of The Skinny wrote, "Beyond the varied range of sonic influence on display, this is easily the most lyrically driven Shadow LP to date". John Bush of AllMusic called it "a carefully crafted, artistically elusive mess".

Track listing

Personnel
Credits adapted from liner notes.

 DJ Shadow – production, arrangement, turntables
 Count – engineering
 Jim Abbiss – engineering
 Paul Insect – art direction, illustration

Charts

Weekly charts

Year-end charts

References

External links
 
 

2006 albums
DJ Shadow albums
Universal Motown Records albums
Albums produced by Droop-E